Adventures of Sonic the Hedgehog is an animated series that is based on the Sonic the Hedgehog video game series produced by Sega of America, DIC Animation City, Bohbot Entertainment and the Italian studio Reteitalia S.p.A. in association with Spanish network Telecinco. Airing during the autumn of 1993, 65 episodes were produced, which was syndicated by Bohbot Entertainment in the United States.

A spin-off video game, Dr. Robotnik's Mean Bean Machine was developed, which features several original characters from the series. Furthermore, other elements, such as Sonic's fondness for chili dogs, would be featured in later video games and media of the franchise. Additionally, on November 24, 1996, USA Network aired "Sonic Christmas Blast", a Christmas special which was produced to promote Sonic 3D Blast (originally meant for the ultimately cancelled Sonic X-treme).

Plot
Adventures of Sonic the Hedgehog is a comical, light-hearted and gag-driven adventure series based on the titular character Sonic the Hedgehog, an arrogant and mischievous yet kind-hearted teenage hedgehog with the power to move at supersonic speeds. Sonic, along with his idolizing young friend Tails, regularly oppose the main antagonist Dr. Robotnik, his robot henchmen Scratch, Grounder, and Coconuts, and thwart their plans to conquer their home planet of Mobius.

The series features a short PSA segment titled "Sonic Says" at the end of each episode excluding "Sonic Christmas Blast"; these segments were written by Phil Harnage.

Characters

Heroes
 Sonic the Hedgehog is the main character of the series. Sonic travels the world and works to defend Mobius from the threat of Dr. Robotnik. Just like in the video games, Sonic can move at fast speeds. He has also shown to be quite cunning and deceitful, using various tricks and disguises to get one over his opponents, especially whenever his speed is nullified.
 Miles "Tails" Prower is a two-tailed fox who is Sonic's best friend and sidekick. Sonic found him as a toddler, apparently abandoned because of his multiple tails, which he can use to fly like in the video games. He usually displays child-like intelligence but has shown to have exceptional skills as a mechanic and a pilot like his video game counterpart.

Villains
 Dr. Ivo Robotnik is an evil mad scientist and the arch-enemy of Sonic the Hedgehog, who uses his robots and inventions in order to take over Mobius. His headquarters is a fortress atop Mobius' tallest mountain, where he uses his Robo-Matic Machine to create robots called Badniks to aid him in his plots. While Robotnik is somewhat capable at defeating Sonic and Tails due to his technology, his childish, manic and often egotistical nature greatly overpowers his tyrannical side, always leading to his defeat and humilation by Sonic and/or Tails.
 Super Special Sonic Search and Smash Squad (S.S.S.S.S. Squad for short) are a trio of Badniks that are Robotnik's primary minions who more than often help him in his schemes.
 Scratch is a hot-headed chicken-like Badnik. Originally, Dr. Robotnik wanted the Robo-Matic Machine to create a super robot only for it to produce Scratch instead due to a malfunction. Scratch is arrogant, but not very bright, although he does seem to be more intelligent than his usual partner, Grounder.
 Grounder is Scratch's younger non-identical twin brother; a dimwitted mole-type Badnik who was created by Dr. Robotnik when he put one of Scratch's tail feathers into the Robo-Matic Machine. He has tank treads for legs and drills for a nose and hands (though he frequently swaps them for other tools, even actual hands on occasion). He is based on the enemy of the same name from Sonic the Hedgehog 2.
 Coconuts is a cynical monkey-type Badnik who was created before Scratch and Grounder. At some point, he was demoted to working as Dr. Robotnik's janitor and is often trying to impress him by outdoing Scratch and Grounder in stopping Sonic to no avail. Despite this, he is shown to be much smarter than Scratch and Grounder and is shown to have his own styled gadgets in his attempts of defeating Sonic. He is based on the enemy of the same name from Sonic the Hedgehog 2.

Other
 Breezie is a beautiful hedgehog-type Badnik created by Dr. Robotnik in a plot to get rid of Sonic. She initially manipulated Sonic into falling in love with her and giving her various gifts, but when she realized that Sonic really did care for her and does not see her as a robot, she developed genuine romantic feelings for him and betrayed and left Dr. Robotnik's services. Breezie later met Robotnik Jr. who later developed a crush on her.
 Momma Robotnik is the mother of Dr. Robotnik who is even worse than her son. While kept in an asylum called the Mobius Home for Really Bizarre Mothers as punishment for bad parenting, she tends to escape on occasion and her insanity even scares her son. At the end of most of her appearances, she ends up recaptured and taken back to the home against her will.
 Wes Weasley is a weasel who works as a salesman at H.D.S.V.A.D.L. (Handy Dandy Super Villain Appliance Distributors Limited) company. He would often sell devices to Dr. Robotnik that would either fail because of either Sonic's ingenuity or Scratch and Grounder's incompetence. He frequently alternates between being on Robotnik and Sonic's side, and will switch to another if there is a profit to be made or if something does not lean in his favor.
 Sergeant Doberman is a Doberman Pinscher who is a retired army sergeant and a known war hero.
 Professor Von Schlemmer is a brilliant but eccentric and kooky scientist who is an ally of Sonic and Tails.
 Professor Caninestein is a highly-intelligent dog scientist that invents gadgets for Sonic to use. Dr. Robotnik once captured him and had him build a time machine in order to steal four Chaos Emeralds in different time periods.
 Robotnik Jr. is a diminutive Badnik resembling Robotnik, which the latter initially created to be his son and carry on his legacy when he passes away. Unfortunately, he defects from his creator and sides with Sonic and Tails. Jr. later fell in love with Breezie.
 Mad Mike and Big Griz are a duo of Bears who both go by the name "Da Bears". They are Sonic and Tails' proclaimed biggest fans and despite their low intelligence, display great feats of courage and strength.
 Roxy is a female racoon and the only known employee of Bert's Diner. She has a crush on Sonic, which he returns at the end of her debut episode, Untouchable Sonic.
 Bert Whoo is a green owl. He is the owner of Bert's Diner as well as the Mayor and Sheriff of Mobius Corners. When Robotnik issued an unlawful protection service on Mobius Corners, Bert was one of its few citizens who refused to pay and as a result, ran his own Diner to financially support himself. He is kidnapped by Scratch and Grounder, but is rescued by Sonic and Tails, with some assistance from his employee Roxy.
 Miss Possum is a possum who became the Sheriff of Tranquil Gulch following the retirement of Sonic. She develops an attraction towards Sonic as he frequently saves her from Scratch and Grounder. She later attends Sonic's birthday in Robotnikland.

Voice cast

Main
 Jaleel White as Sonic the Hedgehog, Masonic, Mummified Hedgehog
 Christopher Stephen Welch as Miles "Tails" Prower
 Long John Baldry as Doctor Robotnik, Robotnikhotep I
 Phil Hayes as Scratch, Sergeant Doberman
 Garry Chalk as Grounder, Professor Caninestein, Captain Rescue, Dragon Breath, Computer
 Ian James Corlett as Coconuts, Robotnik Jr., Rocket the Sloth, Gambling Sheep, Doctor Warpnik, Wallace A. Ditso, Sketch Lampoon, Goobster

Additional
 Kathleen Barr as Katella, Momma Robotnik, Miss Sniffed, Lucinda, additional voices
 Michael Benyaer as Lawrence
 Jay Brazeau as Robot Santa, Santa Claus, Spelunk, additional voices
 Jim Byrnes as Thrust, Coachnik
 Babz Chula
 Jennifer Copping as Henrietta
 Michael Donovan as Wes Weasley
 Kyle Fairlie
 Terry Klassen as Doctor Quark, additional voices
 Wally Marsh
 Scott McNeil as MacHopper
 Shane Meier
 Jane Mortifee
 Pauline Newstone
 John Stocker
 Jayleen Stonehouse as the Waitress (in "Too Tall Tails")
 John Tench
 Venus Terzo as Breezie
 French Tickner as Professor Von Schlemmer
 Lee Tockar as Wick
 Louise Vallance as Miss Possum, Catty Carlisle
 David Ward
 Cathy Weseluck as Suzie, Robot, Rebot, Becky, Penelope, Cat, Parrot
 Alec Willows as the Music Destroyer
 Dale Wilson

Unaired pilot
 Russi Taylor as Miles "Tails" Prower
 Jim Cummings as Dr. Robotnik, Scratch, Additional voices
 Gary Owens as Narrator

Episodes

Pilot

Main episodes

Special

Production
Adventures of Sonic the Hedgehog was created by DIC Animation City (in association with Sega of America whose CEO Tom Kalinske and newly appointed consumer products director Michealene Risley licensed the characters to DIC), which produced a total of 65 episodes for its one season, and was syndicated by Bohbot Entertainment, later known as BKN International (in the original run, every episode began and ended with the "Bohbot Entertainment Presents" logo), and the Italian Reteitalia S.p.A., part of Fininvest. The show's animation was outsourced to four animation studios: 
 the Chinese subdivision of Rainbow Animation Group (later renamed Galaxy World, Inc., not to be confused with the Italian studio Rainbow S.p.A.),
 the Korean Sae Rom Production (which also at the same time worked on the animation for the Saturday morning Sonic cartoon for ABC),
 the Taiwanese Hong Ying Animation (which would later work on the animation for Sonic Underground),
 the Japanese Tokyo Movie Shinsha (which would later produce its own Sonic cartoon, Sonic X). 
Additionally, some of the storyboards were done by the Spanish animation studio Milimetros Dibujos Animados, which also worked on the animation for the Saturday morning Sonic cartoon and the main title animation for Sonic Underground.

According to Robby London, DIC originally made a deal to produce only the Saturday morning Sonic series for the ABC network, which was originally planned to air in the Fall of 1992. The cartoon was to be more light-hearted compared to the final product, as reflected by the episode "Heads or Tails", early promotional material found in Fleetway's Sonic the Comic and the early issues of Sonic the Hedgehog comics by Archie, which were based on the Saturday morning Sonic cartoon. However, DIC also wanted to expand the show and produce additional episodes for weekday syndication as well, similar to what DIC has previously done with The Real Ghostbusters, but Mark Pedowitz, ABC's senior vice president of business affairs and contracts, expected Sonic to air exclusively on ABC and rejected the idea, telling London "If you guys want to do syndication, be our guest, go with God, but you won’t be on our network." ABC would not agree to the deal until London came up with a proposition that DIC would produce a separate, vastly different Sonic show for syndication instead, the end result of which became Adventures of Sonic the Hedgehog. Afterward, ABC was at first willing to air only a single half-hour episode as a prime-time special scheduled for March 1993 (which would become the episode "Heads or Tails") before ultimately delaying it and including it as part of the show which ABC picked up again for a full season, this time airing in the Fall of 1993, alongside Adventures airing in syndication at the same time. During that time, the Saturday morning Sonic cartoon received a makeover and was made darker and more serious in order to differentiate itself from the syndicated Sonic cartoon.

Broadcast and distribution

First-run broadcast

The series was shown through syndication in the United States in the fall of 1993 on either weekday afternoons or mornings, depending on the TV station. In the United Kingdom, the series was screened on Channel 4 in 1993 on Sunday mornings at 9:00, but with the "Sonic Says" segments edited out. They were also edited out on The Children's Channel and the UK VHS releases of the series. The weekday morning airings in Australia on Seven Network as part of Agro's Cartoon Connection retained the segments. The cartoon was broadcast in the Republic of Ireland on RTÉ Two from 12 September to December 1994 on weekday afternoons with the segments retained also.

Rebroadcast and international airings
USA Network re-aired the original episodes of the show in the United States from 1994 to 1996 (with an additional Christmas special ordered by Sega to be produced for the Christmas season of 1996 to ride on the coattails with the release of Sonic 3D Blast). The series later returned to syndication as part of the BKN block from 1997 to 1998, and later BKN Kids II from 1999 until 2000. Toon Disney would start broadcasting the series in September 1998, and aired on the channel until 2002.

This TV subsequently aired the first 13 episodes of the show from 2010 to 2011 on their Cookie Jar Toons block. The series was also available on Netflix, and contains 20 episodes. From December 2018-November 2020, reruns of the series began airing on Starz. Later starting on September 3, 2019, the show aired its reruns on the streaming service Pluto TV for the first time.

In the UK, Channel 4 and Pop re-aired the show with the "Sonic Says" segments restored.

In Italy, the show aired on Italia 1.

In Spain, the show aired on Telecinco.

The show was re-aired on in Australia Saturday mornings on Network Ten as part of Cheez TV from 1993 to 1999, and also aired on Nickelodeon and Disney Channel.

In Brazil, the show aired in January 1996, on Rede Globo on the block TV Colosso. Only the first 22 of 65 episodes aired in Brazilian Portuguese, as well as the Christmas special. The show also aired in Sweden on TV3, in Portugal on SIC, in The Netherlands on RTL4, in Germany on Kabel 1 and RTL II and in 2000 in Arab countries on Spacetoon and Qatar Television.

The series also aired on KidsCo, as with many other DIC-produced cartoons.

In the Philippines, it aired on Yey! in 2020 everyday at 2:00 pm.

Home media

North America
In 1994, Buena Vista Home Video through their DIC Toon-Time Video label, released 6 VHS tapes of the series each containing 2 episodes.

Shout! Factory has released all 65 episodes of the series on DVD in Region 1 in three-volume sets. The first volume, released on July 17, 2007, features the first 22 episodes along with two featurettes: "A Conversation With Artist Milton Knight" and "How to Draw Sonic the Hedgehog". The second volume was released on December 9, 2008, and features episodes 23–44 with the featurette "How to Draw Dr. Robotnik". The third volume contains the final 21 episodes of the series, plus the "Sonic Christmas Blast" special and the featurette "How to Draw Tails". These episodes were not compiled in the correct airdate order in the final volume. These sets were discontinued in 2012 along with Sonic the Hedgehog and Sonic Underground after Shout!'s deal with Cookie Jar Entertainment expired.

From 2007–2010, NCircle Entertainment released a number of single disc releases of the series.

Invincible Pictures re-released the complete series set on August 13, 2019 (originally scheduled for April 9, 2019 and July 16, 2019).

The series along with its successors Sonic the Hedgehog and Sonic Underground is available on the streaming services Paramount+ and Tubi, as well as the official WildBrain YouTube Channel.

Under license from 41 Entertainment and Invincible Entertainment Partners, Discotek Media released the complete series on standard definition Blu-ray on February 22, 2022. The unaired pilot and the Christmas special Sonic Christmas Blast were included as bonus features.

DVD

Blu-ray

United Kingdom
Throughout 1993–1994, Abbey Home Entertainment through their Tempo Video label released 8 VHS volumes of the series each containing an assortment of episodes. PolyGram Video through their 4Front Video label would also release a VHS tape of the series in 1997.

In Region 2, Delta Home Entertainment released Adventures of Sonic the Hedgehog: The Complete Series on DVD in the UK on June 11, 2007.

Broadcast UK history
Channel 4 (1993–1997) 
The Children's Channel (1995–1998) 
POP (2004–2010) 
ITV2 (4 October 2004 – 31 December 2004) (as part of GMTV2 kids)

Reception
Adventures of Sonic the Hedgehog received a mixed reception. Randy Miller III of DVDTalk said, "While it's obvious that The Adventures of Sonic the Hedgehog [sic] won't ever be mentioned in the same sentence with Disney, Pixar or Studio Ghibli (except for this one), there's enough goofy fun here to entertain any resident of the 16-bit gaming era." Michael Rubino of DVD Verdict criticized the series for being dated, contrived, and bloated with chili dog jokes. GamesRadar listed the series as one of "the worst things to happen to Sonic." It commented that it "made Ren & Stimpy look like a rigid, strictly story-driven opus of animation", and criticized the supporting cast as "wholly uninteresting, unfunny and just all around annoying."

Emily Ashby of Common Sense Media gave the series an overall rating of 3/5 and noted that while the show's pace is "frantic", "the series emphasizes positive themes for kids about personal safety and interpersonal relationships." Bob Mackey of USgamer wrote that the show's attempts to emulate Looney Tunes and The Ren & Stimpy Show "were done in by the lack of quality control that typically plagued 65-episode syndicated series", and that "the zippy, timing-reliant slapstick Adventures relied on never stood a chance against the animation sweatshops DIC regularly used to pump out their nearly endless supply of televised content."

Ian Flynn, writer for the Sonic the Hedgehog comic book series by Archie Comics, remarked that Adventures was the closest to "[getting] Sonic right" despite "fail[ing] on the details", although he observed that the show's gags were "polarizing" and that the guest characters "ranged from tired tropes (Breezie) to Saturday Night Live knockoffs (Da Bears)". Pierre DeCelles, who worked on the show as a Senior Animation Director at Hong Ying animation studio, has described the show as "fun and humorous".

Robotnik's catchphrase "Snooping as usual I see" gave rise to the internet meme "PINGAS" during the late 2000s, which has been widely referenced on YouTube.

See also

 Dr. Robotnik's Mean Bean Machine

Notes

References

External links

Adventures of Sonic the Hedgehog at DHX Media

1993 American television series debuts
1996 American television series endings
1990s American animated television series
1990s American comic science fiction television series
1990s American daily animated television series
Television series by DIC Entertainment
English-language television shows
First-run syndicated television programs in the United States
Animated series based on Sonic the Hedgehog
USA Action Extreme Team
American children's animated action television series
American children's animated adventure television series
American children's animated comic science fiction television series
American children's animated science fantasy television series
Animated television series about hedgehogs
Discotek Media
Television series set on fictional planets